is a Japanese manga artist best known for her series Planet Ladder, licensed in English by Tokyopop, and The Young Magician, licensed in English by CMX. Narushima is a member of the dōjinshi circle Comodo.

Bibliography

Manga 
Replica Master (1996, Shinshokan)
The Young Magician (1996–2005, serialized in Wings Comics, Shinshokan)
Genjuu Bunsho (1996–2005, serialized in Wings Comics, Shinshokan)
Planet Ladder (1998–2003, serialized in Crimson, Sobisha/Shueisha)
Shinazu No Agito (2000–2004, serialized in Ultra Jump, Shueisha)
Shounen Kaiki (2000–2005, serialized in Asuka, Kadokawa Shoten)
Tetsuichi (2005–present, serialized in Comic Zero Sum, Ichijinsha) 
Hakka Haien no Shujin to Shitsuji (2007, serialized in Asuka, Kadokawa Shoten)
Light Novel (ライトノベル, 2010–2012)
Boku to Utsukushiki Bengoshi no Bōken (ぼくと美しき弁護士の冒険, 2013–present)

References

External links 

 Official website 

Manga artists
Year of birth missing (living people)
Living people